Mauprat is a 1926 French silent drama film directed by Jean Epstein, based on the eponymous novel by George Sand. Luis Buñuel, who had enrolled in Epstein's acting school, was the production assistant and had a small acting role in the film.

Cast 
 Sandra Milovanoff – Edmée de Mauprat 
 Maurice Schutz – Tristan de Mauprat / Hubert de Mauprat
 Nino Constantini – Bernard de Mauprat 
 René Ferté – Monsieur de La Marche
 Alex Allin – Marcasse
 Halma – Jean de Mauprat
 Alexej Bondireff
 Luis Buñuel – Monk / Guardsman

References

External links 
 
 Review by the entertainment website Avoir Alire 

French silent feature films
French black-and-white films
1920s historical drama films
French historical drama films
1920s French-language films
Films directed by Jean Epstein
Films based on French novels
Films set in the 18th century
1926 drama films
1926 films
Films based on works by George Sand
Silent drama films
1920s French films